The 1999 Faber Grand Prix singles was the singles event of the seventh edition of the Faber Grand Prix; a WTA Tier II tournament held in Hanover, Germany. Patty Schnyder was the defending champion but lost in the second round to Elena Likhovtseva.

Jana Novotná won in the final 6–4, 6–4 against Venus Williams. This was her first win at the Faber Grand Prix after having lost in the past three finals.

Seeds
The top four seeds received a bye to the second round.

Draw

Finals

Top half

Bottom half

Qualifying

Seeds

Qualifiers

Lucky loser
  Miriam Oremans

Qualifying draw

First qualifier

Second qualifier

Third qualifier

Fourth qualifier

External links
 1999 Faber Grand Prix Draw

Faber Grand Prix
Faber Grand Prix